Publius Cornelius Dolabella was a consul of the Roman Republic in 283 BC. He is best noted for having defeated a combined force of the Etruscans, and the Boii and the Senones, two of the Gallic tribes of northern Italy, at the Battle of Lake Vadimon of 283 BC. Appian named him the leader of the expedition which devastated the Ager Gallicus (the name the Romans gave to the land which had been conquered by the Senone Gauls) and expelled the Senones from their land. This episode was also recorded by Polybius. In Polybius' text this happened before the battle of Lake Vadimon. In Appian's text it is unclear and might have happened afterwards. 

According to Appian, Dolabella was killed in 282 BC when the Tarentines attacked and sank a small fleet of triremes under the command of Admiral Lucius Valerius. He either drowned, or was taken prisoner and executed in the city.

References

External links 
Appian's History of Rome: The Samnite Wars

Ancient Roman generals
3rd-century BC Roman consuls
282 BC deaths
Dolabella, Publius
Year of birth unknown
3rd-century BC diplomats